Access © or Access Copyright is the operating name of a Canada Business Corporations Act corporation whose official registration name is The Canadian Copyright Licensing Agency (formerly Cancopy). It is a not-for-profit copyright collective that collects revenues from licensed Canadian businesses, government, schools, libraries and other copyright users for the photocopying of print works and distributes those monies to the rightsholders of those works, such as publishers and authors from Canada and around the world.

Access Copyright covers works published in Australia, Argentina, Canada, Denmark, France, Germany, Greece, Hong Kong, Iceland, Ireland, Italy, Liechtenstein, Malta, Netherlands, New Zealand, Norway, South Africa, Singapore, Spain, Switzerland, United Kingdom, and the United States.

University model license

When universities sign on to a license with Access Copyright (negotiated by the Association of Universities and Colleges of Canada (AUCC) or the Association of Canadian Community Colleges), their professors and students are given permission to do certain copying of copyrighted works. The university is generally charged a base rate per full-time student for this license, usually passed down to students in the form of mandatory fees.
2011 AUCC model license
A new model, negotiated by AUCC in 2011, would see universities pay a rate of $26 per full-time student. The old agreement, which expired in 2010, charged only $3.38 plus an additional 10 cents per page coursepacks, photocopied compilations of readings designed by instructors and sold to students. Moreover, additional stipulations would proscribe faculty and students from keeping copies of journal articles in personal libraries, or on personal computers or email accounts.

These changes have proved controversial, and numerous universities have opted out of the deal.

Universities that have opted out:
Athabasca University
Brock University
Carleton University
MacEwan University
McMaster University
Memorial University
Mount Allison University
Mount Royal University
Queen's University
Ryerson University
University of Alberta
University of British Columbia
University of Calgary
University of New Brunswick
University of Ottawa
University of Saskatchewan
University of Toronto
University of Victoria
University of Manitoba
University of Northern British Columbia
University of Waterloo
University of Western Ontario
University of Windsor
University of Winnipeg
York University

Universities that have signed on:

Controversy

Access Copyright has also started charging universities for e-mailing links to copyrighted information, even in cases where there was no copyrighted material present. They are charging the full price for each link e-mailed.

In late 2019, Access Copyright obtained a court order requiring 300 schools across Canada to supply handouts and lesson plans from the last seven years. The demand, intended to find use of copyright material, was described as a 'logistical nightmare'.

See also 
 Copyright Clearance Center
 Captain Copyright
 Alberta (Education) v Canadian Copyright Licensing Agency (Access Copyright)

References

External links
 Access Copyright website

Canadian copyright law
Copyright collection societies
Trade associations based in Canada